La Guerre is a novel by French Nobel laureate writer J. M. G. Le Clézio and translated into English as War.

1970 French novels
Novels by J. M. G. Le Clézio
Éditions Gallimard books